Faridur Rahaman better known as Pantho Rahaman (11 September 1980) is a journalist of Bangladesh.  He work as special correspondent of Channel i. He has received the National ICT Award for the year 2017, for his special contribution in ICT journalism. He is the president of Diplomatic Correspondents Association Bangladesh for the year 2021.

Organization
He has been elected two times as general secretary of Diplomatic Correspondents Association, Bangladesh (DCAB), a diplomat journalist organization in Bangladesh.

Awards
 National ICT Award, 2017

References

1980 births
Living people
University of Dhaka alumni